Thomas Royden, 1st Baron Royden,   (22 May 1871 – 6 November 1950) was an English businessman and Conservative Party politician.

He was the son of Sir Thomas Royden, 1st Baronet  (1831–1917), a Conservative politician and head of the Thomas Royden & Sons shipping company.  The younger Thomas inherited the baronetcy on the death of his father in 1917, and went on to become chairman of the Cunard Line.

He was elected at the 1918 general election as Member of Parliament (MP) for Bootle, having stood as a Coalition Conservative (a holder of the "coalition coupon" issued to candidates supporting of the Conservative-Liberal Party coalition government.  He did not stand for re-election in the 1922 general election.

He was made a Companion of Honour in 1919. His sister Maude Royden "eminent in the religious life of the nation" was appointed to the Order of the Companions of Honour in the 1930 New Year Honours; they are the only siblings to be Companions of Honour. He was ennobled on 28 January 1944 as Baron Royden, of Frankby in the County Palatine of Chester. He died in 1950 aged 79.

References

External links 
 

1871 births
1950 deaths
Conservative Party (UK) MPs for English constituencies
Deputy Lieutenants of Hampshire
UK MPs 1918–1922
UK MPs who were granted peerages
Members of the Order of the Companions of Honour
English businesspeople
British businesspeople in shipping
Conservative Party (UK) hereditary peers
Barons created by George VI